Clodagh McKenna (born 10 May 1975) is an Irish chef, author of cookbooks, columnist and television presenter. She has demonstrated cookery on The Rachael Ray Show, ITV's This Morning and hosted several television series and writes a column for the Evening Standard.

Television 
In Clodagh's Irish Food Trails, a television series consisting of 13 episodes aimed at the American market, she travelled Ireland to such places as  Skelligs rock, Dingle's sea caves and Fastnet Rock's lighthouse. There, she explored various foods, farmers' markets and met local chefs, fishermen and farmers.

Personal life 
On 1 October 2020, McKenna announced her engagement to her partner, The Hon. Harry Herbert — son of The 7th Earl of Carnarvon ('Porchey'); the couple live together at Broadspear House in Highclere Park. Harry Herbert is a well-known figure in the world of thoroughbred racing, and is the CEO of Highclere Thoroughbred Racing. He is the younger brother of The 8th Earl of Carnarvon.

The couple were married on Saturday 14 August 2021 at the Church of Saint Michaels and All Angels, Highclere, near Highclere Castle, better known as the fictional Downton Abbey and birthplace of the groom, Harry Herbert.

Books 
 The Irish Farmers' Market Cookbook (2009)
 Fresh From the Sea (2009)
 Homemade (2010)
 Clodagh's Kitchen Diaries (2012)
 Clodagh's Irish Kitchen (2015)
 Clodagh's Suppers (2019)
 Clodagh's Weeknight Kitchen (2020)
 A Recipe for Success (2021)(guest contributor)
 In Minutes (28 October 2021)

See also 
 List of women cookbook writers

References 

Irish chefs
Women cookbook writers
Irish television presenters
Irish columnists
1975 births
Living people
Irish women columnists
Irish women television presenters
Irish television chefs
People educated at Scoil Mhuire, Cork